Plaion (formerly Koch Media) is a German-Austrian media company headquartered in Höfen, Tyrol, Austria, with an operating subsidiary based in Planegg, Germany. The company was founded in 1994 by Franz Koch and Klemens Kundratitz. The company operates video game publishing labels Deep Silver, Prime Matter and Ravenscourt, the video game developers Warhorse Studios and Milestone, as well as a film distribution arm, Plaion Pictures. Koch Media's parent company, Koch Media Holding, was acquired by Swedish holding company Embracer Group (then known as THQ Nordic AB) in February 2018.

History

Early history (1994–2015) 

Koch Media was founded in 1994 by Franz Koch (founder of Koch International) and his business partner, Klemens Kundratitz to market and distribute software. Koch Media operated out of offices in Germany and Austria, while a regional subsidiary, Koch Media Ltd., was opened in England. In 1995, Koch Media sold more than 250,000 software licenses, and in 1996, the company began distributing video games. Another regional subsidiary, Koch Media AG, was formed in Switzerland in 1998. A holding company, Koch Media Holding, was established in 2000 to unite Koch Media's business areas. The same year, Koch Media srl was formed as a regional subsidiary for Italy.

In 2002, Koch Media established Deep Silver as a video game publishing division to "complement games that [Koch Media] was distributing". A film division, Koch Home Entertainment, was announced in June 2003 and formally formed in early October. A game label for mass-market games, Fantastic.tv, was announced in November 2003. In October 2005, Koch Media acquired French distributor SG Diffusion, which had recently signed with NCsoft to distribute their game Guild Wars. SG Diffusion was renamed Koch Media SAS in January 2006. In February 2006, they established Koch Media Licensing GmbH as their license holding subsidiary. Another game label, named Spielen wir ( "Let's Play"), was created in July 2008 to publish casual games under. The same month, Koch Media acquired Proein, the Spanish distribution arm of SCi Entertainment, to undisclosed terms. Proein was renamed Koch Media S.L.U. in January 2009. Regional offices for Scandinavian and Benelux countries, operated by the England subsidiary, were opened in February and July that year, respectively. In March 2012, Koch Media had 250 employees. The creation of another game publishing label named Ravenscourt, focusing on simulation games, was announced in March 2015. In August 2015, Koch Media Licensing GmbH was renamed Koch Films GmbH and absorbed the operations of the former Koch Home Entertainment division.

Under Embracer Group (2018–present) 
On 14 February 2018, Koch Media Holding was acquired by THQ Nordic AB (later known as Embracer Group), a Swedish video game holding company. The purchase agreement was signed at 8:00 AM, and the deal was announced that same day.

Koch and Kundratitz had owned 90% and 10% in the company, respectively, and both of them sold their shares, and THQ Nordic AB became the sole owner of the company. According to manager Reinhard Gratl, the sale primarily came about because Koch wanted to retire, and no one in his family was interested in taking over the business. He asked for all money to be paid to Koch Media instead of him, so the company could profit from the deal. Koch resigned from Koch Media on the same day. Koch Media's management, consisting of chief executive officer Kundratitz, chief financial officer Gratl and chief operating officer Stefan Kapelari, was subsequently joined by THQ Nordic AB's Erik Stenberg.

On 13 February 2019, Koch Media entered into an agreement to acquire Czech developer Warhorse Studios. Warhorse's game Kingdom Come: Deliverance had been co-published by Deep Silver exactly one year prior, and Koch Media paid , equal to Warhorse's 2018 earnings, to seize ownership over the studio and its intellectual property. The acquisition closed later that day. The two acquisitions added 120 and 8 employees, respectively, to Koch Media's staff.

In June 2019, THQ Nordic AB acquired KSM GmbH, a German distributor of anime films, from its founder and chief executive officer (CEO), Benjamin Krause. KSM is to be merged into Koch Films. Gaya Entertainment is to be consolidated with Koch Media's operations. On 14 August 2019, Koch Media agreed to fully acquire racing game developer Milestone srl and all of its intellectual property for  paid in cash. The acquisition was completed later that day.

Koch Films acquired Sola Media, a Stuttgart, Germany-based television-and-film licenser for children and family properties, in August 2020. Later that month, Koch Media opened offices in Hong Kong and Tokyo, both headed by Kundratitz, to expand publishing operations in Southeast Asia.

In September 2020, Koch Media acquired Vertigo Games, who develops, publishes, and distributes games exclusively for virtual reality platforms, including zombie survival FPS Arizona Sunshine and action FPS After the Fall.

In November 2020, Koch Media acquired Flying Wild Hog.

In March 2021, Koch Media signed a €50 million co-publishing deal with Starbreeze Studios to finance the production, release, and post-launch support of co-op shooter Payday 3, with Starbreeze Studios retaining ownership of the IP.

Koch Media opened a new publishing division, Prime Matter, in June 2021, operating from its Munich headquarters.

Rebranding as Plaion 
On 4 August 2022, Koch Media rebranded themselves as Plaion.

On 18 October 2022, Plaion Pictures announced it had acquired British anime distribution company Anime Limited for an undisclosed sum.

Offices 
As of February 2018, Plaion is headquartered in Höfen, a municipality with a population of roughly 1,200 people that is located in Austria's Tyrol region and close to Bavaria, Germany. In Höfen, Plaion occupies an office complex in which the company employs 150 people in various departments. The property, as well as an adjacent  plot, is owned by Embracer Group. In Planegg, a municipality in Bavaria that is located close to Munich, Plaion operates a subsidiary branch also called Plaion GmbH.

Subsidiaries

See also 
 List of Deep Silver games
 List of Prime Matter games
 List of Ravenscourt games

References

External links 
 

 
Austrian companies established in 1994
Embracer Group
Mass media companies of Austria
Mass media companies established in 1994
2018 mergers and acquisitions
Economy of Tyrol (state)